Glutamate-rich WD repeat-containing protein 1 is a WD40 repeat protein that in humans is encoded by the GRWD1 gene. It localizes to the nucleus and has known functions in regulating chromatin openness and loading of MCM helicase.

References

Further reading